The Phobos Science Fiction Anthology Volume 2 - Hitting the Skids in Pixeltown (2003) is an anthology edited by Orson Scott Card and Keith Olexa.  It contains thirteen stories by different writers.  All of them were winners of the 2nd Annual Phobos Fiction Contest for new writer, with the exception of Larry Niven, author of "The Coldest Place".

Story list 
The short stories in this book are:

"The Takers" by Rosemary Jones
"Hidden Scars" by Kyle David Jelle
"RUWattU8" by Harold Gross
"Hitting the Skids in Pixeltown" by Matthew S. Rotundo
"The Beast of All Possible Worlds" by Carl Frederick
"Callus Redux" by Rebecca Carmi
"All in My Mind" by Eugie Foster
"The Bear Eater" by Paul Pence
"His Untrue Colors" by Jake West
"If Thy Right Hand Offend Thee..." by Christine Watson
"Ukaliq and the Great Hunt" by David D. Levine
"Warrior Heart" by David John Baker
"The Coldest Place" by Larry Niven

Related works
The Phobos Science Fiction Anthology Volume 1
The Phobos Science Fiction Anthology Volume 3

External links
 The official Phobos Books website

2003 anthologies
Science fiction anthology series